Speedway Grand Prix of Finland is part of the Speedway Grand Prix World Championship series.

Winners

Finland
Speedway in Finland